Ivankovo is a rural locality (a village) in Malyshevskoye Rural Settlement, Selivanovsky District, Vladimir Oblast, Russia. The population was 9 as of 2010.

Geography 
The village is located 15 km east from Malyshevo, 19 km south from Krasnaya Gorbatka.

References 

Rural localities in Selivanovsky District